Grace Gua Ah-leh (born 2 June 1944) is a Taiwanese actress and singer. Gua has portrayed over 200 roles in film and television since 1965. She has won the Golden Horse Awards 4 times and the Golden Bell Awards twice.

Life and career
Also known as Kuei Ya-lei and Grace Gua, Gua Ah Leh was born in China in 1944.  She studied acting at the National Taiwan University of Arts.  In 1965, she made her professional movie debut in The Rain of Sorrow, and received a Golden Horse Award for Best Leading Actress. That award made her the youngest Leading Actress winner in the Golden Horse history.  Next year, she was in the movie Home, Sweet Home.  Her performance in that movie won the Best Leading Actress in the Asia Pacific Film Festival (Indonesia), and another Best Leading Actress Golden Horse award.  In 1978, she won the Best Supporting Actress Golden Horse award for her role in The Diary of Di-Di.

In 1986, Gua Ah-leh was the producer for Fortune, Prosperity, Longevity, and Happiness a TV show that focused attention on senior care.  In 1991, she won a Golden Bell Award leading actress for her role in the TV show Her Growth.  In 1997, she won a second Golden Bell Award leading actress for her role in the TV show Marian.  In 1993, she worked with director Ang Lee in the movie The Wedding Banquet and went on to receive the Best Supporting Actress Golden Horse award.  She was also nominated in the Independent Spirit Awards for Best Supporting Female in US. In 1994, she worked with Ang Lee again and was nominated as the Best Supporting Actress in the Golden Horse Awards for the movie Eat, Drink, Man, Woman.   In 1995, she won the Best Leading Actress award in Eastern Europe in the Karlovy Vary International Film Festival for Maiden Rose.  In 1997, she won the Golden Bell Best Leading Actress award for the TV show Virgin Mary.  In 2006, she won the Best Supporting Actress in the Hundred Years Flower Award for the movie The Knot in China.

For the last five years, she has been working on films in Hong Kong, China and Taiwan that support equal rights and same sex marriage. In 2015, she was the leading actress in the film Baby Steps, which was one of the most popular gay movies in Taiwan. Her performance was nominated for Best Actress at Los Angeles Outfest 2015, and won the Best Actress award at the 2015 Winston-Salem Out at the Movies Festival.

Selected filmography
Film
 The Rain of Sorrow (1965)
 You Can't Tell Him (1971)
 The Coldest Winter in Peking (1981)
 The Anger (1982)
 Lai Shi, China's Last Eunuch (1988)
 Miracles (1989)
 The Wedding Banquet (1993)
 Eat Drink Man Woman (1994)
 Tonight Nobody Goes Home (1996)
 The Knot (2006)
 20 Once Again (2015)
 Baby Steps (2015)
 Summer's Desire (2016)

Television series
 Palace of Desire (2000)
 Ju Zi Hong Le (橘子红了) (2001)
 The Prince of Qin, Li Shimin (2005)
 The Emperor in Han Dynasty (2005)
 The Dream of Red Mansions (2010)
 The Legend of Incorruptible Stone (2011)
 Poetry of the Song Dynasty (2019)

Awards and nominations
Golden Horse Film Festival (1965), Best Leading Actress for The Rain of Sorrow
Golden Horse Film Festival (1966), Best Leading Actress for Home, Sweet Home
Asia Pacific Film Festival (1966), Best Leading Actress for Home, Sweet Home
Golden Horse Film Festival (1978), Best Leading Actress for Didi's Diary
Golden Bell Award (1991), Best Leading Actress for TV Her Growth (她的成長)
Golden Horse Film Festival (1993), Best Supporting Actress for The Wedding Banquet
Karlovy Vary International Film Festival (1995), Best Leading Actress for Maiden Rose
Hundred Flowers Awards (2008), Best Supporting Actress for "The knot"
Chinese American Film Festival (2019), Golden Angel for Best Actress in a Leading Role for Number One

References

External links

 Gua Ah-leh on Facebook
 

1944 births
Living people
21st-century Taiwanese actresses
Taiwanese television actresses
21st-century Chinese actresses
20th-century Chinese actresses
Taiwanese film actresses
20th-century Taiwanese actresses
Actresses from Changsha
Taiwanese people from Hunan
Taiwanese stage actresses
National Taiwan University of Arts alumni
Taiwanese Mandopop singers
Singers from Hunan
20th-century Taiwanese women singers